Juan Carlos Carrizo (born 3 June 1987) is an Argentine footballer who plays as a midfielder.

Club career
Carrizo started his football career in the youth divisions of San Lorenzo. He moved to PSV Eindhoven in 2005 but has not made a first-team appearance. Next season Carrizo was loaned to Elche CF. In 2007, he was loaned again to Olimpo. PSV released him in the summer of 2008.

In 2009, he joined Club Atlético Huracán. He has since played for numerous lower league sides in Argentina, as well as Unión San Felipe in Chile.

References

External links
 Primera División statistics  
 Juan Carlos Carrizo on loan at Olimpo in Argentina
 

1987 births
Living people
Sportspeople from San Miguel de Tucumán
Argentine footballers
Argentine expatriate footballers
Olimpo footballers
Club Atlético Huracán footballers
Unión San Felipe footballers
Primera B de Chile players
Expatriate footballers in Chile
Association football midfielders
PSV Eindhoven players
Elche CF players
San Lorenzo de Almagro footballers
Argentinos Juniors footballers
Juventud Antoniana footballers
Torneo Argentino A players
Torneo Argentino B players
Expatriate footballers in the Netherlands
Argentine expatriate sportspeople in the Netherlands
Argentine expatriate sportspeople in Chile